Talk with the Spirits is an album by pianist/composer Mike Longo recorded in 1976 and released by the Pablo label.

Reception

AllMusic reviewer Scott Yanow stated "Longo gathered together an impressive sextet ... The music, five of Longo's originals, is less memorable than the solos, but this remains a fine effort that ranges from lightly funky to straight-ahead".

Track listing
All compositions by Mike Longo
 "Wyyowa" – 7:50
 "Roma" – 6:20
 "The Proclamation" – 7:10
 "Angel of Love" – 9:18
 "Talk with the Spirits" – 13:19

Personnel 
Virgil Jones – trumpet
Harold Vick – tenor saxophone
George Davis – guitar
Mike Longo – piano
Bob Cranshaw – bass
Mickey Roker – drums
Dizzy Gillespie – conga drums, vocals

References 

1976 albums
Mike Longo albums
Pablo Records albums